Tetanocera elata is a species of fly in the family Sciomyzidae. It is found in the  Palearctic
Larvae of T. elata are known obligate feeders on slugs both as parasitoids and predators.

References

External links
Images representing Tetanocera elata at BOLD

Sciomyzidae
Insects described in 1781
Diptera of Europe